Khasani is a location in the La Paz Department, Bolivia.

References

Populated places in La Paz Department (Bolivia)